Murgași is a commune in Dolj County, Oltenia, Romania with a population of 2,508 people. It is composed of eight villages: Balota de Jos (the commune center), Balota de Sus, Bușteni, Gaia, Murgași, Picăturile, Rupturile, and Velești.

The commune is located in the northeastern part of the county and belongs to the Craiova metropolitan area.

References

Communes in Dolj County
Localities in Oltenia